A potassium channel opener is a type of drug which facilitates ion transmission through potassium channels.

Examples 
Some examples include:

Diazoxide vasodilator used for hypertension, smooth muscle relaxing activity
Minoxidil vasodilator used for hypertension, also used to treat hair loss
Nicorandil vasodilator used to treat angina
Pinacidil
Retigabine, an anticonvulsant
Flupirtine, analgesic with muscle relaxant and anticonvulsant properties

See also 
 Potassium channel blocker

References